The Assumption Cathedral  also called Catholic Cathedral of Chania and alternatively Cathedral of the Assumption of the Virgin Mary is the Roman Catholic cathedral in Chania, on the island of Crete in Greece.

History

It was built in 1879 by the first Catholic bishop of Crete, Aloisio Cannavo, to serve the entire Catholic population of the region. In 2004, the cathedral celebrated its 125th anniversary. The church is under the responsibility of the Capuchin Order.

The cathedral follows the Roman or Latin rite and is the seat of the Roman Catholic Diocese of Crete (Dioecesis Candiensis or Επισκοπή Κρήτης) that was originally created in 1213 and was restored by Pope Pius IX in 1874.

See also
Roman Catholicism in Greece

References

Roman Catholic cathedrals in Greece
Buildings and structures in Chania
Roman Catholic churches completed in 1879
Churches in Crete
19th-century Roman Catholic church buildings in Greece